Alexandra "Ally" Fowler (born 6 December 1961) is an Australian actress and singer. She is known for her roles as Angela Hamilton in Sons and Daughters (1982–84) and Zoe Davis in Neighbours (1986);  both series were produced by the Grundy Organisation, and in 1985, she was cast in another Grundy serial, Possession, just before that series was cancelled. 

As a singer, Fowler is known as one of the four female vocalists of the band Chantoozies (1986–91), which had top 10 hits with a cover version of "Witch Queen" in 1987 and an original track, "Wanna Be Up" in 1988. Their debut self-titled album peaked at No. 8 on the ARIA Albums Chart in September 1988. After the group disbanded Fowler returned to acting, with roles in Big Sky (1997), All Saints (2005–07) and Wentworth (2013–14). From 2012 she has also participated in reunion gigs by Chantoozies.

Career
Alexandra Fowler had small roles in The Young Doctors and Sara Dane, before coming to prominence playing Angela Hamilton in Sons and Daughters. She joined the cast of Neighbours as Zoe Davis in 1986, after being approached by the Grundy Organisation. After deciding not to extend her contract with the serial, Fowler departed in September 1986. She also played a regular role in soap Possession (1985) and was a regular lead in Big Sky (1997) alongside actor Gary Sweet. She also appeared in The Flying Doctors and Frankie's House.

On 24 August 2001, she appeared on the Australian-American science fiction series Farscape in the episode "Fractures" as the voice of Orrhn. From 15 November 2005 to 2007, she played the recurring role of Eve Ballantyne on the Australian drama series All Saints.

From June 2013, Fowler began appearing in season one of Wentworth as Simone "Simmo" Slater and carried on right up until season 2 episode 6. However, she did make a cameo again in season 3 episode 12. Fowler rejoined the cast of Neighbours in late 2015 as Nene Williams.

In 2022, Fowler joined the filming for mini series Riptide.

Music career 

Fowler was one of four female vocalists in the 1980s Australian pop music band, Chantoozies (1986–91), which also included David Reyne. The other three females were Tottie Goldsmith, Eve von Bibra and Angelica La Bozzetta. Their first single was a number-four hit with a cover version of "Witch Queen" (March 1987). The group had success with other singles including a number-six hit with "Wanna Be Up" (May 1988), and top 40 peaks for "He's Gonna Step on You Again" (June 1987, No. 36), "Kiss 'n' Tell" (August 1988, No. 25) and "Love the One You're With" (March 1991, No. 21). They also issued two albums, Chantoozies (September 1988, No. 8) and Gild the Lily (April 1991, No. 71).

From 2012, Chantoozies have performed reunion gigs and released a single, "Baby It's You", in April 2014.

References

External links
 

1961 births
Living people
Australian women pop singers
Australian film actresses
Australian soap opera actresses
Chantoozies members
20th-century Australian actresses
21st-century Australian actresses
20th-century Australian women singers
21st-century Australian women singers
People educated at Wilderness School